Five Peace Band Live is a 2009 post bop/jazz fusion album from keyboardist Chick Corea and guitarist John McLaughlin with alto saxophonist Kenny Garrett, bassist Christian McBride and drummer Vinnie Colaiuta.

Background 
They toured Europe between October 22 and November 23, 2008, subsequently touring North America, and went on to Asia in early 2009 with Brian Blade on drums.

Reception 
The album was very well received, winning the 2010 Grammy Award for Best Jazz Instrumental Album.

John Kelman in his All About Jazz review said "Running the gamut from straight-ahead to balls-out fusion, Five Peace Band Live is a rare opportunity to hear two masters create something that references both of their careers but combines to create something with its own distinct personality.".

Track listing

Disc one

"Raju" (John McLaughlin) – 
"The Disguise" (Chick Corea) – 
"New Blues, Old Bruise" (John McLaughlin) – 
"Hymn to Andromeda" (Chick Corea) –

Disc two
"Dr. Jackle" (Jackie McLean) – 
"Senor C.S." (John McLaughlin) – 
"In a Silent Way / It's About That Time" (Miles Davis, Joe Zawinul) – 
"Someday My Prince Will Come" (Frank Churchill, Larry Morey) –

Personnel 
Musicians
 Chick Corea – acoustic piano, electric piano, synthesizer
 John McLaughlin – electric guitar
 Kenny Garrett – alto saxophone
 Christian McBride – acoustic bass, electric bass
 Vinnie Colaiuta – drums, percussion
 Herbie Hancock – piano (2:3)

Production
 Bernie Kirsh – engineer
 Sven Hoffman – engineer
 Brian Vibberts – engineer (mixing)
 Bernie Grundman – engineer (mastering)

References 

2008 albums
Chick Corea live albums
John McLaughlin (musician) live albums
Concord Records live albums
Grammy Award for Best Jazz Instrumental Album